Modestus Dickson Kilufi (born 11 March 1959) is a Tanzanian CCM politician and Member of Parliament for Mbarali constituency since 2010.

References

1959 births
Living people
Chama Cha Mapinduzi MPs
Tanzanian MPs 2010–2015
Njombe Secondary School alumni